The Eucumbene River, a perennial river of the Snowy River catchment, is located in the Snowy Mountains region of New South Wales, Australia.

Course and features
The river flows generally south and southeast before emptying into Lake Eucumbene where its flow is impounded by Eucumbene Dam. After passing through or over the dam wall, the river flows generally south before emptying into Lake Jindabyne, impounded by Jindabyne Dam. Within Lake Jindabyne, the river reaches its confluence with the Snowy River.

The river descends  over its  course, joined by seven minor tributaries.

The flow of the river is impacted by alpine conditions, with high flows during spring as a result of snow melt. During winter, the river is subject to snow and ice conditions.

The Snowy Mountains Highway crosses the river at several locations between Adaminaby and Kiandra.

See also

 List of rivers of New South Wales (A-K)
 List of rivers of Australia
 Rivers of New South Wales
 Snowy Mountains Scheme

References

External links
 Snowy Flow Response Monitoring and Modelling

 

Rivers of New South Wales
Snowy Mountains Scheme
Adaminaby